Ville Seivo (born 28 June 1978 ) is a Finnish actor, who played Tuomo Tervajoki in the Finnish soap series Salatut elämät. Seivo also played Johnny in TV-series Käenpesä.

He has been in Jonna Kosonen's music video "Sateen jälkeen" (Finnish: After the Rain).

Filmography
 Käenpesä – Johnny (2007) TV
 Salatut elämät – Tuomo Tervajoki (2006–2008, 2011, 2014) TV
 Järvi – mies (aka Sjön – Swedish title) (2006) Film
 Uudisraivaaja (2006) – Panu (4 episodes) TV
 Sota & rauha – Kommando #2 (2006)TV
 Caasha – Pete (2005)TV
 Skene – Jokke (2004)TV

References

Finnish male actors
1978 births
Living people